In mathematical analysis, Mosco convergence is a notion of convergence for functionals that is used in nonlinear analysis and set-valued analysis. It is a particular case of Γ-convergence. Mosco convergence is sometimes phrased as “weak Γ-liminf and strong Γ-limsup” convergence since it uses both the weak and strong topologies on a topological vector space X. In finite dimensional spaces, Mosco convergence coincides with epi-convergence, while in infinite-dimensional ones, Mosco convergence is strictly stronger property.

Mosco convergence is named after Italian mathematician Umberto Mosco, a current Harold J. Gay professor of mathematics at Worcester Polytechnic Institute.

Definition

Let X be a topological vector space and let X∗ denote the dual space of continuous linear functionals on X. Let Fn : X → [0, +∞] be functionals on X for each n = 1, 2, ... The sequence (or, more generally, net) (Fn) is said to Mosco converge to another functional F : X → [0, +∞] if the following two conditions hold:

 lower bound inequality: for each sequence of elements xn ∈ X converging weakly to x ∈ X,

 upper bound inequality: for every x ∈ X there exists an approximating sequence of elements xn ∈ X, converging strongly to x, such that

Since lower and upper bound inequalities of this type are used in the definition of Γ-convergence, Mosco convergence is sometimes phrased as “weak Γ-liminf and strong Γ-limsup” convergence.  Mosco convergence is sometimes abbreviated to M-convergence and denoted by

References

Notes 

Calculus of variations
Variational analysis
Convergence (mathematics)